Kobe Steel, Ltd. (株式会社神戸製鋼所, Kabushiki gaisha Kōbe Seikō-sho), is a major Japanese steel manufacturer headquartered in Chūō-ku, Kobe. KOBELCO is the unified brand name of the Kobe Steel Group.

Kobe Steel has the lowest proportion of steel operations of any major steelmaker in Japan and is characterised as a conglomerate comprising the three pillars of the Materials Division, the Machinery Division and the Power Division. 

The materials division has a high market share in wire rods and aluminium materials for transport equipment, while the machinery division has a high market share in screw compressors. In addition, the power sector has one of the largest wholesale power supply operations in the country. 

Kobe Steel is a member of the Mizuho keiretsu. It was formerly part of the DKB Group, Sanwa Group keiretsu, which later were subsumed into Mizuho.
The company is listed on the Tokyo & Nagoya Stock Exchange, where its stock is a component of the Nikkei 225.  

As of March 31, 2022, Kobe Steel has 201 subsidiaries and 50 affiliated companies across Japan, Asia, Europe, the Middle East and the US. Its main production facilities are Kakogawa Steel Works and Takasago Works. 

Kobe Steel is also famous as the owner of the rugby team Kobelco Steelers.

History 
 
In 1905, the general partnership trading company Suzuki Shoten acquired a steel business in Wakinohama, Kobe, called Kobayashi Seikosho, operated by Seiichiro Kobayashi, and changed its name to Kobe Seikosho. Then, in 1911, Suzuki Shoten spun off the company to establish Kobe Steel Works, Ltd. at Wakinohamacho, Kobe. 

After the Russo-Japanese War, as the Imperial Japanese Navy adopted a policy of fostering civilian factories, Kobe Steel received technical guidance and orders from the Kure Naval Arsenal and other arsenals in Maizuru and Yokosuka, and expanded its scale. 

The company later expanded its performance, partly due to the wartime shipbuilding boom, and began to make its way as a machinery manufacturer; in 1918 it took over the rights to produce diesel engines from the Swiss company Sulzer, which helped speed up the Japanese naval, marine, locomotive and automobile transport sectors. 

Today, the KOBELCO Group operates a broad range of business fields that cover Steel & Aluminum, Advanced Materials, Welding, Machinery, Engineering, Construction Machinery, and Electric Power. 

In the Great Hanshin Earthquake of January 1995, the Kobe head office building and company housing collapsed, and the No. 3 Blast Furnace at the Kobe Steel Works was also damaged, resulting in an emergency shutdown, causing approximately JPY 100 billion in damage, the largest for a private company. The Third Blast Furnace, which restarted only two and a half months after the earthquake, had become a 'symbol of recovery', but was suspended in October 2017 in order to strengthen competitiveness.  In recent years, the company has been focusing on fields other than steel, such as aluminium, machinery, and electric power, and is clearly aiming to change from being a 'steelmaker' to a 'manufacturer that also handles steel'. 

Former prime minister Shinzō Abe worked at Kobe Steel before entering politics.

Main locations

Domestic Locations  
 Kobe Head Office 
 Tokyo Head Office
 Takasago Works
 Kobe Corporate Research Laboratories
 Kakogawa Works 
 Research & Development Laboratory
 Kobe Wire Rod & Bar Plant 
 Fujisawa Office
 Ibaraki Plant
 Saijo Plant
 Fukuchiyama Plant
 Moka Works
 Chofu Works
 Daian Works

Overseas Regional Headquarters and Offices 
 Kobe Steel USA Inc. (U.S. headquarters): 19575 Victor Parkway, Suite 200 Livonia, MI, 48152, USA
 Kobelco (China) Holding Co., Ltd. (China headquarters, investment company): Room 3701, Hong Kong New World Tower, No.300 Middle Huai Hai Zhong Road, Huangpu District, Shanghai, 200021, People's Republic of China
 Kobelco (China) Holding Co., Ltd. (Guangzhou Branch): Room 1203, #285 East Linhe Road, Tianhe District, Guangzhou City, Guangdong Province, People's Republic of China
 Kobelco South East Asia Ltd. (Regional headquarters for Southeast Asia and South Asia): 17th Floor, Sathorn Thani Tower ll, 92/49 North Sathorn Road, Khwaeng Silom, Khet Bangrak, Bangkok, 10500, Kingdom of Thailand
 Kobelco Europe GmbH (Regional Headquarters for Europe and the Middle East): Luitpoldstrasse 3, 80335 Munich, Germany

Business Units & Main Products

Steel & Aluminum
 Steel Sheets
 Wire Rods and Bars
 Aluminum Plate
 Steel Plates

Welding
 Robots and Electric Power Sources
 Welding Materials

Advanced Materials
 Steel Castings and Forgings
 Titanium
 Copper Sheet and Strip
 Steel Powder

Machinery
 Standard Compressors
 Rotating Machinery
 Tire and Rubber Machinery
 Plastic Processing Machinery
 Advanced Technology Equipment
 Rolling Mill・Press Machine
 Ultra High Pressure Equipment
 Energy & Chemical Field

Engineering
 Iron Unit Field
 Advanced Urban Transit System

Electric Power
 Wholesale Power Supply

Scandal
In October 2017, Kobe Steel admitted to falsifying data on the strength and durability of its aluminium, copper and steel products. The scandal deepened when the company said it found falsified data on its iron ore powder, which caused its shares to fall 18%. By 11 October, shares had fallen by a third. After testing the parts of their bullet trains, the Central Japan Railway Company announced that 310 components were discovered to contain sub-standard parts supplied by Kobe Steel.

Following further news in October 2017 that car makers Toyota, Nissan, and General Motors, and train manufacturer Hitachi, were among 200 companies affected by the Kobe Steel's mislabelling, which had potential safety implications for their vehicles, the CEO of Kobe Steel conceded that his company now had "zero credibility". Other affected companies include Ford, Boeing and Mitsubishi Heavy Industries. CEO Kawasaki promised to lead an internal investigation. On 13 October 2017, Kobe Steel admitted that the number of companies misled was over 500.

Despite the costs of dealing with the scandal, Kobe Steel issued a revised profit forecast in February 2018 announcing that it expects to generate a net profit of ¥45 billion ($421 million) for the full 2017 fiscal year, marking its first net profit in three years.

Gallery

See also

 Kobeseiko Te-Gō

References

External links
 Official global website 
 Kobe Steel Group of Companies
 History of Kobe Steel Group
 Kobelco Construction Machinery Europe

Steel companies of Japan
Crane manufacturers
Construction equipment manufacturers of Japan
Companies listed on the Tokyo Stock Exchange
Companies listed on the Nagoya Stock Exchange
Companies listed on the Osaka Exchange
Manufacturing companies based in Kobe
Manufacturing companies established in 1905
Japanese companies established in 1905
Defense companies of Japan
Japanese brands
Midori-kai
Industrial machine manufacturers